The Mercedes-Benz M116 is an automotive V8 engine made in several versions by Mercedes-Benz between 1969 and 1991. All models were gasoline powered, and utilized a single overhead camshaft with 2 valves per cylinder and Bosch Jetronic fuel injection. The larger M117 V8 followed, introduced initially in the US market.

3.5
The original M116 engine 116.980 was introduced August 1969 in the 300SEL 3.5. This engine and its twin, the 116.981 remained in production until 1980 when it was replaced by its larger 3.8 litre variant.

Bore x Stroke:  Displacement

Usage 
1971-1980 Mercedes-Benz C107
1971-1980 Mercedes-Benz R107
1970-1972 Mercedes-Benz W108
1969-1972 Mercedes-Benz W109
1970-1971 Mercedes-Benz W111
1973-1980 Mercedes Benz W116

3.8
This engine reached North America later for the 1981 380SL. There were 116.961, 116.962, and 116.963 versions of this engine. Early models came with a single row timing chain until 1983 and were plagued with chain failure problems which Mercedes-Benz would repair free of charge, changing the timing chain to a dual row thus resolved the problem making these engine as durable and reliable as any other Mercedes V8. All 1984+ models came with a double row timing chain from the factory to prevent this failure, however this engine was replaced for the 1986 model year by its larger 4.2 litre variant.

Bore x Stroke:  Displacement

Usage 
1980-1982 Mercedes-Benz C107
1980-1985 Mercedes-Benz R107
1979-1985 Mercedes-Benz W126
1982-1983 Monteverdi Tiara

4.2
The 116.965 engine was introduced in 1986 for the revised S-Class. It featured 9.0:1 compression and had from  depending on year and export market. All engines were mated to the Mercedes-Benz 4G-Tronic transmission. This engine was used until 1991 when it was replaced by the newer 4.2L Double overhead camshaft Mercedes-Benz M119 engine with which it shares no parts.

Bore x Stroke:  Displacement

Usage 
1986-1989 Mercedes-Benz R107
1986-1991 Mercedes-Benz W126

References

External links 

M116
V8 engines
Gasoline engines by model